Merci la vie is a 1991 French film written and directed by Bertrand Blier. It won the César Award for Best Actor in a Supporting Role, and was nominated for Best Film, Best Actress, Best Supporting Actress, Best Director, Best Writing and Best Editing.

Plot 
Naive schoolgirl Camille Pelleveau meets the slightly older and more experienced Joëlle, a promiscuous woman who has just been thrown out of a car by her abusive boyfriend. Camille follows Joëlle as they go on a rampage where she discovers sex as they pick up men. Joëlle also shows Camille the darker side of life, as they start by crashing the men's cars and then decide to take on the whole town. However, medical researcher Dr. Marc Antoine Worms has invented a sexually transmitted disease and used Joëlle as a guinea pig by infecting her with it, so that he could become famous as the discoverer of its cure. Camille eventually learns about AIDS and fears she may have contracted the disease.

The story involves flashbacks, and in one sequence we learn that Camille's parents are feuding. Illogically, she tries to persuade them to reunite long enough for her conception to take place. The surreal plot and series of stylized scenes is in keeping with postmodern cinema, which challenges the notion of original creative thought.

Cast 
Charlotte Gainsbourg as Camille Pelleveau
Anouk Grinberg as Joëlle
Michel Blanc as Raymond Pelleveau (Young Father)
Jean Carmet as Raymond Pelleveau (Old Father)
Annie Girardot as Evangéline Pelleveau (Old Mother)
Catherine Jacob as Evangéline Pelleveau (Young Mother)
Jean-Louis Trintignant as SS Officer
Thierry Frémont as François
Gérard Depardieu as Doctor Marc Antoine Worms
François Perrot as Maurice 
Yves Rénier as Robert
Jacques Boudet as Craven
Laurent Gamelon as The Brother-in-Law
Anouk Ferjac as Mother in clinic
Didier Bénureau as Assistant Director
Jean-Michel Dupuis as Lorry Driver
Vincent Grass

References

External links 
 
 
 

1991 films
Films directed by Bertrand Blier
Films featuring a Best Supporting Actor César Award-winning performance
French drama films
1990s French films